Metopoceras solituda is a moth of the family Noctuidae first described by Brandt in 1938. It is found in the eremic (desert) parts of Africa, north to south-western Iran and the Near East, where it occurs in Saudi Arabia, the Sinai in Egypt, Israel, Jordan, Lebanon and Syria.

Adults are on wing from March to April. There is one generation per year.

Subspecies
Metopoceras solituda solituda
Metopoceras solituda eutychina (Israel, ...)

External links

Metopoceras
Moths of the Middle East